The Rhodes football team is the football team which represents the island of Rhodes, at the biannual Island Games. Rhodes is not a member of FIFA or UEFA, it is an island within Greece and plays under the auspices of the Hellenic Football Federation, the governing body for football in Greece.

Selected internationals in Island Games

Tournament records

Island Games record

References

External links
Hellenic Football Federation official website 
List of matches in Roon Ba

European national and official selection-teams not affiliated to FIFA
Sport in Rhodes
Greece national football team